CSM Știința Baia Mare is a professional Romanian rugby union club from Baia Mare, which plays in the Liga Națională de Rugby, the first division of Romanian rugby. Ever since the second part of the 2010s decade, they have been the most successful rugby union team in Romania, achieving eight championship titles and three of the Romanian cups.

History
CSM Știința Baia Mare was founded in 1977, although originally under the name of Racemin Baia Mare and would, after only a couple of years after their formation, become one of the powerhouses in the then known 	Divizia Naţională de Seniori alongside Steaua and Dinamo from the capital.

As the 1980–81 season had arrived, Baia Mare managed to win their first ever tournament, the Romanian cup by defeating Dinamo București 13–12 in what was a close and entertaining game as described by the locals of Baia Mare. Following the Romanian cup, Baia Mare then also became the champions of Romania for their first time ever in the 1989–90 season, where rugby in Romania was considered at its peak.

However, their successes were not able to be sustained as the Bison`s only managed to win two Romanian cups after their first championship title, once in 1990 and once again in 1999 before winning their second championship title 20 years later in 2009. At the turn of the decade, Știința Baia Mare had finally found their groove once again as they managed to win the championship five times within ten years and only faced major issues against SCM Rugby Timișoara during their championship campaigns.

Honours

Domestic

Leagues
Liga Națională de Rugby
Winners (9): 1989–90, 2008–2009, 2010, 2011, 2014, 2018–19, 2019-20, 2021, 2022
Runners-up (5): 2012, 2013, 2015, 2016–2017, 2017–18

Cups
Cupa României
Winners (6): 1980–81, 1989–90, 1998–99, 2010, 2012, 2020
Runners-up (12): 1981–82, 1985–86, 1987–88, 1999–00, 2005–06, 2006–07, 2011, 2013, 2014, 2016, 2017–18, 2021
Cupa Regelui
Winners (2) – Record: 2016, 2017
Runners-up (1): 2015

International
Central and Eastern European Rugby Union Cup
Winners (2) – Record: 2009–10, 2010–11

Current squad

Current coaching staff
The current coaching staff of Știința Baia Mare:

See also
 Rugby union in Romania
 Toyota Challenge

References

External links
 Official Website 
 SuperLiga Squad Details 
 itsrugby.co.uk Squad Details 

Romanian rugby union teams
Rugby clubs established in 1977
1977 establishments in Romania
Sport in Baia Mare